The 6th Massachusetts Volunteer Infantry Regiment was reconstituted in early 1898 as a unit of volunteers to fight in the Spanish–American War, under the command of Colonel Edmund Rice. The unit should not to be confused with the 6th Infantry Regiment of Regulars, which also fought in the war, though in the Philippines and Cuba.

6th Massachusetts deployed to Puerto Rico, landed at Guanica and worked its way east and inland to Ponce and Arecibo. In October of that year, it returned to Massachusetts and was disbanded. The unit's experience in the Spanish–American War was recorded by Lance-Corporal George King of the regiment's Concord Company in his letters home, which he later published in 1929.

References

 King, George G.  Letters of a Volunteer in the Spanish–American War.  Chicago: Hawkins & Loomis, 1929.

External links
Library of Congress American Memory: Puerto Rico at the Dawn of the Modern Age

Military units and formations established in 1898
1898 disestablishments
Military units and formations of the United States in the Spanish–American War
Military units and formations disestablished in 1898